Leucine zipper transcription factor like 1 also known as LZTFL1 is a ubiquitously expressed protein which localizes to the cytoplasm and in humans is encoded by the LZTFL1 gene.

Function 
This protein regulates protein trafficking to the ciliary membrane through interaction with the Bardet-Biedl syndrome (BBS) complex of proteins.

Clinical significance 
Mutations in the LZTFL1 gene are associated with Bardet-Biedl syndrome, and the gene also acts as a tumor suppressor through regulation of epithelial-mesenchymal transition.

Identified as the gene on chromosome 3 at location 3p21.31 responsible for mediating an associated with genetic susceptibility to SARS-CoV-2 infection and COVID-19 respiratory failure. The DNA segment conferring the risk is inherited from Neanderthals.

References 

Proteins
Genetics
Human genetics